The 2017–18 Saint Joseph's Hawks women's basketball team represents the Saint Joseph's University during the 2017–18 NCAA Division I women's basketball season. The Hawks, led by seventeenth year head coach Cindy Griffin, play their home games at Hagan Arena and were members of the Atlantic 10 Conference. They finished the season 19–15, 10–6 in A-10 play to finish in a tie for fifth place. They advanced to the championship game of the A-10 women's tournament where they lost to George Washington. They received an at-large bid to the Women's National Invitation Tournament where they defeated Seton Hall in the first round before losing to West Virginia in the second round.

Media
All non-televised Hawks home games air on the A-10 Digital Network. All Hawks games are streamed via the Saint Joseph's Sports Network on sjuhawks.com.

Roster

Schedule

|-
!colspan=9 style=| Non-conference regular season

|-
!colspan=9 style=| Atlantic 10 regular season

|-
!colspan=9 style="background:#; color:#FFFFFF;"| Atlantic 10 Women's Tournament

|-
!colspan=9 style="background:#; color:#FFFFFF;"| WNIT

Rankings
2017–18 NCAA Division I women's basketball rankings

See also
 2017–18 Saint Joseph's Hawks men's basketball team

References

Saint Joseph's Hawks women's basketball seasons
Saint Josephs
Saint Joseph's
Saint Joseph's
Saint Joseph's